Xerocomellus chrysenteron, formerly known as Boletus chrysenteron or Xerocomus chrysenteron, is a small, edible, wild mushroom in the family Boletaceae. These mushrooms have tubes and pores instead of gills beneath their caps. It is commonly known as the red cracking bolete.

Taxonomy
This mushroom was first described and named as Boletus communis in 1789 by the eminent French  botanist Jean Baptiste Francois Pierre Bulliard. Two years later, in 1791, it was given the specific epithet chrysenteron by the same author, the species name coming from the Ancient Greek words khrysos "gold" and enteron "innards". In 1888, Lucien Quelet placed it in the new genus Xerocomus, retaining the chrysenteron epithet. This binomial was generally accepted until 1985 when Marcel Bon decided to resurrect the former specific epithet communis, which resulted in the binomial Xerocomus communis. While it recently resided back in the genus Boletus, as B. chrysenteron Bull., recent phylogenetic analysis supports its placement as the type species of the new genus Xerocomellus, described by Šutara in 2008.

Description
Young specimens often have a dark, dry surface, and tomentose caps. The caps mature to convex and plane in old age. Cracks in the mature cap reveal a thin layer of light red flesh below the skin.
The 1 to 2 cm-diameter stems have no ring, are mostly bright yellow and the lower part is covered in coral-red fibrils and has a constant elliptical to fusiform diameter throughout its length of 4 to 10 cm tall. The cream-colored stem flesh turns blue when cut.
The species has large, yellow, angular pores, and produces an olive brown spore print.

The fruit bodies of X. chrysenteron are prone to infestation by the bolete eater (Hypomyces chrysospermus).

Distribution and habitat
Xerocomellus chrysenteron grows singly or in small groups in hardwood/conifer woods from early fall to mid-winter. It is mycorrhizal with hardwood trees, often beech on well drained soils. It is frequent in parts of the northern temperate zones. The species has been recorded in Taiwan. It has been introduced to New Zealand, where it grows in groups under introduced deciduous trees.

This species may not be as common as once thought, having been often mistaken for the recently recognised B. cisalpinus Simonini, Ladurner & Peintner.

Edibility
Xerocomellus chrysenteron is considered edible but not desirable due to bland flavor and soft texture. The pores are recommended to be removed immediately after mushrooms are picked as they rapidly decay. Young fungi are palatable and suitable for drying, but they become slimy when cooked; mature specimens are rather tasteless and decay quickly.

Gallery

Similar species
Xerocomellus chrysenteron cannot be identified with certainty without the aid of a microscope, as many intermediate forms occur between it and other taxa, in particular, some forms of Boletus pruinatus and Hortiboletus rubellus. B. porosporus is also similar to this species, but it is easily separated on account of the whitish under layer and truncate (chopped off) spores. This species is also easily confused with B. cisalpinus, B. declivitatum, B. dryophilus, B. mirabilis, B. truncatus, and B. zelleri. The caps are similar to Imleria badia, the bay bolete.

See also
List of North American boletes

References

External links

Xerocomus chrysenteron
About: Xerocomus chrysenteron (Bull.) Quél.

Boletaceae
Fungi of Asia
Fungi of Europe
Fungi of New Zealand
Fungi of North America
Edible fungi
Fungi described in 1789
Taxa named by Jean Baptiste François Pierre Bulliard